Cease Fire (Persian:آتش‌بس, romanized: Atashbas) is a 2006 rom-com Iranian film written and directed by Tahmineh Milani, starring Mohammad Reza Golzar, Mahnaz Afshar, and Atila Pesyani. The movie shows a young couple who are seeking divorce, but end up realizing that they just need to face their Inner child to overcome their difficulties.

Plot
The film begins by showing a married couple Sayeh (Mahnaz Afshar) and her husband, Yousef (Mohammad Reza Golzar) who are both stubborn and spend a lot of their time trying to top the others latest outrageous adventure at getting even. Scene after scene we watch the quarreling couple play childish pranks on each other. The movie goes on with showing that Sayeh wants to seek divorce, but by mistake knocks on the door of a psychiatrist (Atila Pesyani) instead of a lawyer. She is soon discovered in the psychiatrist's office by her husband, Yousef. The psychiatrist informs both that their problem is that they are not behaving maturely, so that they need to live apart from each other for a week. In a week they come back to the psychiatrist, and he tells them that they are trying to act out their “inner child.” He suggests that they need to talk with their inner child. They come back and see the psychiatrist who realizes that they have overcome their difficulties and coped with their "inner child." The couple change their minds about getting a divorce.

Cast
 Mohammad Reza Golzar as Yousef
 Mahnaz Afshar as Saye
 Atila Pesyani as The Psychiatrist
Ahmad Mehranfar as Darab
 Kaykavous Yakide as Ahmad

 Niloufar Khoshkhoulgh as Laleh
 Elsa Firuz Azaar as The Secretary
Mahboubeh Bayat as Yousef's Mother
 Nersi Korkia as Yousef's Father
 Babak Vali as Lawyer

Release
Cease Fire has been awarded in the Fajr Film Festival. It grossed $82,362 in Iran. The film has been described as the Iranian Mr. & Mrs. Smith since it includes a bit of Tom and Jerry cartoons, the writer and director Tahmineh Milani tries to show the comedian exaggerations of the film.

References

External links
 
 

Iranian romantic comedy films
2000s Persian-language films